Robert Pilling Anderson (born July 24, 1893, date of death unknown) was an American cricketer. He played seven first-class matches in 1912 and 1913. All these matches were against Australia, five for the Philadelphian cricket team and two for a combined Canada/USA team. He took nine wickets in his seven matches at an average of 29.55.

References

External links
 Cricket Archive profile
 Cricinfo profile

1893 births
Year of death missing
Philadelphian cricketers
Cricketers from Philadelphia
American cricketers